Boomerang Café is the seventh studio album by Australian country music artist John Williamson. The album was released in April 1988 and peaked at number 10 on the Kent Music Report.

At the inaugural ARIA Music Awards of 1989, the album won ARIA Award for Best Country Album.

At the Country Music Awards of Australia in January 1989, Williamson the album won Top Selling Album and Album of the Year.

Track listing

Charts

Release history

References

1988 albums
Festival Records albums
John Williamson (singer) albums
ARIA Award-winning albums